The Downward Spiral is the second studio album by American industrial rock band Nine Inch Nails, released on March 8, 1994, by Nothing Records in the United States and Island Records in Europe. It is a concept album detailing the self-destruction of a man from the beginning of his misanthropic "downward spiral" to his suicidal breaking point. The album was a commercial success and established Nine Inch Nails as a reputable force in the 1990s music scene, with its sound being widely imitated, and the band receiving media attention and multiple honors.

Band frontman Trent Reznor had moved to 10050 Cielo Drive in Benedict Canyon, Los Angeles, the site of the murder of actress Sharon Tate by members of the Manson Family in 1969; it was transformed into a studio for recording the Broken EP (1992) and subsequently The Downward Spiral with collaborations from other musicians. The album features elements of industrial rock, techno, metal and ambient soundscapes, in contrast to the band's synth-pop-influenced debut album Pretty Hate Machine (1989). Reznor was strongly influenced by David Bowie's Low and Pink Floyd's The Wall for their themes of introspection and dissociation, and their focus on texture and space.

The Downward Spiral has been regarded by music critics and audiences as one of the most important albums of the 1990s, and was praised for its abrasive and eclectic nature and dark themes, although it was sensationalized by social conservatives for some of its lyrics. The album spawned two lead singles, "March of the Pigs" and "Closer", in addition to the promotional singles "Piggy" and "Hurt". The lead singles were accompanied by music videos, with the former shot twice and the latter being heavily censored. A remix album titled Further Down the Spiral was released in 1995.

Writing and recording

Reznor conceived of The Downward Spiral after Nine Inch Nails' run in the lineup of the Lollapalooza festival tour, feeling increasingly alienated and disinterested. The band's concerts were known for their radical onstage dynamic in which members acted aggressively, injured themselves, destroyed instruments and polluted stages. Reznor had begun to feud with TVT Records, resulting in him cofounding Nothing Records with his former manager John Malm, Jr. as a subsidiary of Interscope. Simultaneously, he began fleshing out the concept for The Downward Spiral, focusing on the life and death of a misanthropic man who rebels against humanity, and kills God before attempting suicide. Reznor frequently struggled with drug addiction and depression, and the themes of the album gradually allegorized his living situation. His peers at some point recommended him the antidepressant Prozac, but he declined to be medicated.

Reznor wanted the album's sound to diverge from the abrasion of Broken, emphasizing mood, texture, restraint and subtlety, although he was unsure about its musical direction. The album's production was decided on to aim for "full range" sound, and he focused on texture and space, avoiding conventional usage of guitars or synthesizers with a recognizable sound palette. Subsequently, he mainly worked with a Macintosh computer, using music editor programs on the computer to analyze and invert frequencies in tracks as a form of sound design.

Reznor searched for and moved to 10050 Cielo Drive in 1992 for recording Broken and The Downward Spiral, a decision made against his initial choice to record the album in New Orleans. 10050 Cielo Drive is referred to as the "Tate House" since Sharon Tate was murdered by members of the Manson Family in 1969; Reznor named the studio "Le Pig" after the message that was scrawled on the front door with Tate's blood by her murderers, and stayed there with Malm for 18 months. He called his first night in 10050 Cielo Drive "terrifying" because he already knew it and read books related to the incident. Reznor chose the Tate house to calibrate his engineering skills and the band bought a large console and two Studer machines as resources, a move that he believed was cheaper than renting.

Reznor collaborated with former Jane's Addiction and Porno for Pyros drummer Stephen Perkins, progressive rock guitarist Adrian Belew, and Nine Inch Nails drummer Chris Vrenna. Belew's first visit to the studio involved playing the guitar parts in "Mr. Self-Destruct", and he was told to play freely, think on reacting to melodies, concentrate on rhythm, and use noise. This approach improved Reznor's confidence in the instrument: he found it to be more expressive than the keyboard due to the interface. Belew praised Reznor for his "command of technology," and commented that the music of Nine Inch Nails made innovations "that are in [his] realm." Vrenna and Perkins played drum parts recorded live in the studio; the tracks were rendered into looped samples. Reznor took a similar approach to recording guitar parts: he would tape 20- to 25-minute-long sessions of himself playing guitars on a hard disc recorder with the Studio Vision sequencer.

Reznor frequently sampled excerpts from his guitar session tracks and processed them to sporadic and expressive points to convey the album's themes, also doing the same with drum parts. Digidesign's TurboSynth and Zoom 9030 effects unit were used extensively to process guitar tracks, often in conjunction with a Marshall JMP-1 preamp; Zoom 9030 was also used to distort vocals. Acoustic drums in various settings, as well as Roland's TR-808 and R-70 drum machines were sampled through multiple Akai S1000s and a Kurzweil K2000. Additionally, Vrenna had compiled various movie samples on Digital Audio Tapes for Reznor to sample, which were gradually identified by fans in the decades following the album's release. Other equipments and software Reznor used for recording the album include Oberheim OB-Mx, Minimoog, Prophet VS keyboard, Eventide H3000 Harmonizer, Pro Tools and various Jackson and Gibson guitars.

In December 1993, Reznor was confronted by Patti Tate, who asked if he was exploiting Sharon Tate's death in the house. Reznor responded that he was interested in the house as her death happened there. He later made a statement about this encounter during a 1997 interview with Rolling Stone:

British producer and engineer Flood, known for engineering and producing U2 and Depeche Mode albums, was employed as co-producer on The Downward Spiral; it became his last collaboration with Nine Inch Nails due to creative differences. For instance, a "very dangerously self-destructive" yet humorous short song written for the album, "Just Do It", was not included in the final version, criticized by Flood who said that Reznor had "gone too far." Reznor completed the last song written for the album, "Big Man with a Gun", in late 1993. After the album's recording, Reznor moved out and the house was demolished shortly thereafter. The Downward Spiral entered its mixing and mastering processes, done at Record Plant Studios and A&M Studios with Alan Moulder, who subsequently took on more extensive production duties for future album releases.

Music and lyrics

Numerous layers of metaphors are present throughout The Downward Spiral, leaving it open to wide interpretation. The album relays nihilism and is defined by a prominent theme of self-abuse and self-control. It is a semi-autobiographical concept album, in which the overarching plot follows the protagonist's descent into madness in his own inner solipsistic world through a metaphorical "downward spiral", dealing with religion, dehumanization, violence, disease, society, drugs, sex, and finally, suicide. Reznor described the concept as consisting of "someone who sheds everything around them to a potential nothingness, but through career, religion, relationship, belief and so on." Media journalists like The New York Times writer Jon Pareles noted the album's theme of angst had already been used by grunge bands like Nirvana, and that Nine Inch Nails' depiction was more generalized.

Using elements of genres such as techno, dance, electronic, heavy metal, and hard rock, The Downward Spiral is considered industrial rock, industrial, alternative rock and industrial metal. Reznor regularly uses noise and distortion in his song arrangements that do not follow verse–chorus form, and incorporates dissonance with chromatic melody or harmony (or both). The treatment of metal guitars in Broken is carried over to The Downward Spiral, which includes innovative techniques such as expanded song structures and unconventional time signatures. The album features a wide range of textures and moods to illustrate the mental progress of the central protagonist. Reznor's singing follows a similar pattern from beginning to end, frequently moving from whispers to screams. These techniques are all used in the song "Hurt", which features a highly dissonant tritone played on guitar during the verses, a B5#11, emphasized when Reznor sings the eleventh note on the word "I" every time the B/E# dyad is played.

"Mr. Self Destruct", a song about a powerful person, follows a build-up sampled from the 1971 film THX 1138 with an "industrial roar" and is accompanied by an audio loop of a pinion rotating. "The Becoming" expresses the state of being dead and the protagonist's transformation into a non-human organism. "Closer" concludes with a chromatic piano motif: The melody is introduced during the second verse of "Piggy" on organ, then reappears in power chords at drop D tuning throughout the chorus of "Heresy", and recurs for the final time on "The Downward Spiral". The album was chiefly inspired by David Bowie's Low, an experimental rock album which Reznor related to on songwriting, mood, and structures, as well as progressive rock group Pink Floyd's The Wall, a concept album featuring themes of abuse, isolation, and mental instability.

Packaging
Committere, an installation featuring artwork and sketches for The Downward Spiral, "Closer" and "March of the Pigs" by Russell Mills was displayed at the Glasgow School of Art. Mills explained the ideas and materials that made up the painting (titled "Wound") that was used for the album's cover art:

Promotion

Singles
"March of the Pigs" and "Closer" were released as singles; two other songs, "Hurt" and "Piggy", were issued to radio without a commercial single release. "March of the Pigs" has an unusual meter, alternating three bars of 7/8 time with one of 8/8. The song's music video was directed by Peter Christopherson and was shot twice; the first version scrapped due to Reznor's involvement, and the released second version being a live performance.

"Closer" features a heavily modified bass drum sample from the Iggy Pop song "Nightclubbing" from his album The Idiot. Lyrically, it is a meditation on self-hatred and obsession, but to Reznor's dismay, the song was widely misinterpreted as a lust anthem due to its chorus, which included the line "I wanna fuck you like an animal". The music video for "Closer" was directed by Mark Romanek and received frequent rotation on MTV, though the network heavily censored the original version, which they perceived to be too graphic. The video shows events in a laboratory dealing with religion, sexuality, animal cruelty, politics, and terror; controversial imagery included a nude bald woman with a crucifix mask, a monkey tied to a cross, a pig's head spinning on a machine, a diagram of a vulva, Reznor wearing an S&M mask while swinging in shackles, and of him wearing a ball gag. A radio edit that partially censored the song's explicit lyrics also received extensive airtime. The video has since been made part of the permanent collection of the Museum of Modern Art in New York City.

"Piggy" uses "nothing can stop me now", a line that recurs in "Ruiner" and "Big Man with a Gun". The frantic drumming on the song's outro is Reznor's only attempt at performing drums on the record, and one of the few "live" drum performances on the album. He had stated that the recording was from him testing the microphone setup in studio, but he liked the sound too much not to include it. It was released as a promotional single in December 1994 and reached the Top 20 on the Billboard Modern Rock Tracks chart.

Released in 1995, "Hurt" clearly includes references to self-harm and heroin addiction.

Tour

The Nine Inch Nails live band embarked on the Self Destruct tour in support of The Downward Spiral. Chris Vrenna and James Woolley performed drums and keyboards respectively, Robin Finck replaced Richard Patrick on guitar and bassist Danny Lohner was added to the line-up. The stage set-up consisted of dirty curtains which would be pulled down and up for visuals shown during songs such as "Hurt". The back of the stage was littered with darker and standing lights, along with very few actual ones. The tour debuted the band's grungy and messy image in which they would come out in ragged clothes slathered in corn starch. The concerts were violent and chaotic, with band members often injuring themselves. They would frequently destroy their instruments at the end of concerts, attack each other, and stage-dive into the crowd.

The tour included a set at Woodstock '94 broadcast on pay-per-view and seen in as many as 24 million homes. The band being covered in mud was a result of pre-concert backstage play, contrary to the belief that it was an attention-grabbing ploy, thus making it difficult for Reznor to navigate the stage: Reznor pushed Lohner into the mud pit as the concert began and saw mud from his hair entering his eyes while performing. Nine Inch Nails was widely proclaimed to have "stolen the show" from its popular contemporaries, mostly classic rock bands, and its fan base expanded. The band received considerable mainstream success thereafter, performing with significantly higher production values and the addition of various theatrical visual elements. Its performance of "Happiness in Slavery" from the Woodstock concert earned the group a Grammy Award for Best Metal Performance in 1995. Entertainment Weekly commented about the band's Woodstock '94 performance: "Reznor unstrings rock to its horrifying, melodramatic core—an experience as draining as it is exhilarating". Despite this acclaim, Reznor attributed his dislike of the concert to its technical difficulties.

The main leg of the tour featured Marilyn Manson as the supporting act, who featured bassist Jeordie White (then playing under the pseudonym "Twiggy Ramirez"); White later played bass with Nine Inch Nails from 2005 to 2007. After another tour leg supporting the remix album Further Down the Spiral, Nine Inch Nails contributed to the Alternative Nation Festival in Australia and subsequently embarked on the Dissonance Tour, which included 26 separate performances with co-headliner David Bowie on his Outside Tour. Nine Inch Nails was the opening act for the tour, and its set transitioned into Bowie's set with joint performances of both bands' songs. However, the crowds reportedly did not respond positively to the pairing due to their creative differences. Despite this, in a 2012 Rolling Stone readers' poll, the tour (pairing Nine Inch Nails with Bowie) was named one of the top 10 opening acts in rock history.

The tour concluded with "Nights of Nothing", a three-night showcase of performances from Nothing Records bands Marilyn Manson, Prick, Meat Beat Manifesto, and Pop Will Eat Itself, which ended with an 80-minute set from Nine Inch Nails. Kerrang! described the Nine Inch Nails set during the Nights of Nothing showcase as "tight, brash and dramatic", but was disappointed at the lack of new material. On the second of the three nights, Richard Patrick was briefly reunited with the band and contributed guitar to a performance of "Head Like a Hole". After the Self Destruct tour, Chris Vrenna, member of the live band since 1988 and frequent contributor to Nine Inch Nails studio recordings, left the act permanently to pursue a career in producing and to form Tweaker.

Release and reception

The Downward Spirals release date was delayed at various times to slow down Reznor's intended pace of the album's recording. The first delay caused the process of setting up Le Pig to take longer than he expected, and its release was postponed again as he was educating himself different ways to write songs that did not resemble those on Broken and Pretty Hate Machine. He considered delivering the album to Interscope in early 1993, only to experience a writer's block as he was unable to produce any satisfactory material. Interscope grew impatient and concerned with this progress, but Reznor was not forced by their demands of expediency despite crediting the label for giving him creative freedom. He told rock music producer Rick Rubin that his motivation for creating the album was to get it finished, thus Rubin responded that Reznor might not do so until he makes music that is allowed to be heard. Reznor realized that he was in the most fortunate situation he imagined when the album was recorded with a normal budget, "cool" equipment, and a studio to work at.

Released on March 8, 1994, to instant success, The Downward Spiral debuted at number two on the US Billboard 200, selling nearly 119,000 copies in its first week. On October 28, 1998, the Recording Industry Association of America (RIAA) certified the album quadruple platinum, and by December 2011, it had sold 3.7 million copies in the United States. The album peaked at number nine on the UK Albums Chart, and on July 22, 2013, it was certified gold by the British Phonographic Industry (BPI), denoting shipments in excess of 100,000 copies in the United Kingdom. It reached number 13 on the Canadian RPM albums chart and received a triple platinum certification from the Canadian Recording Industry Association (CRIA) for shipping 200,000 copies in Canada. A group of early listeners of the album viewed it as "commercial suicide", but Reznor did not make it for profit as his goal was to slightly broaden Nine Inch Nails' scope. Reznor felt that the finished product he delivered to Interscope was complete and faithful to his vision and thought its commercial potential was limited, but after its release he was surprised by the success and received questions about a follow-up single with a music video to be shown on MTV. The album has since sold over four million copies worldwide.

Many music critics and audiences praised The Downward Spiral for its abrasive, eclectic nature and dark themes and commented on the concept of a destruction of a man. The New York Times writer Jon Pareles' review of the album found the music to be highly abrasive. Pareles asserted that unlike other electro-industrial groups like Ministry and Nitzer Ebb, "Reznor writes full-fledged tunes" with stronger use of melodies than riffs. He noticed criticisms of Nine Inch Nails from industrial purists for popularizing the genre and the album's transgression. Village Voice critic Robert Christgau gave it an "honorable mention" in his capsule review column and summed the record up as, "musically, Hieronymus Bosch as postindustrial atheist; lyrically, Transformers as kiddie porn." Jonathan Gold, writing for Rolling Stone, likened the album to cyberpunk fiction. Entertainment Weekly reviewer Tom Sinclair commented: "Reznor's pet topics (sex, power, S&M, hatred, transcendence) are all here, wrapped in hooks that hit your psyche with the force of a blowtorch."

Accolades
The Downward Spiral has been listed on several publications' best album lists. In 2003, the album was ranked number 200 on Rolling Stone magazine's list of The 500 Greatest Albums of All Time, then was re-ranked 201 in a 2012 revised list. The Rolling Stone staff wrote: "Holing up in the one-time home of Manson-family victim Sharon Tate, Trent Reznor made an overpowering meditation on NIN's central theme: control." It moved up to 122 on the magazine's revised list in 2020. The album was placed 10th on Spins 125 Best Albums of the Past 25 Years list; the Spin staff quoted Ann Powers' review that appreciated its bleak, aggressive style. It was ranked number 488 in the book The Top 500 Heavy Metal Albums of All Time by heavy metal music critic Martin Popoff. In 2001, Q named The Downward Spiral as one of the 50 Heaviest Albums of All Time; in 2010, the album was ranked number 102 on their 250 Best Albums of Q's Lifetime (1986–2011) list. The Downward Spiral was featured in Robert Dimery's book 1001 Albums You Must Hear Before You Die. In May 2014, Loudwire placed The Downward Spiral at number two on its "10 Best Hard Rock Albums of 1994" list. In July 2014, Guitar World placed The Downward Spiral at number 43 in their "Superunknown: 50 Iconic Albums That Defined 1994" list.

Legacy

The immediate success of The Downward Spiral established Nine Inch Nails as a reputable force in the 1990s. The band's image and musical style became so recognizable that a Gatorade commercial featured a remix of "Down in It" without their involvement. Reznor felt uncomfortable with the media hype and success the band earned, received false reports of his death, depression, and was falsely reported to have had a relationship with serial killer Jeffrey Dahmer, and was depicted as a sex icon due to his visual appearance. Nine Inch Nails received several honors, including Grammy Award nominations for Best Alternative Performance for The Downward Spiral and Best Rock Song for "Hurt". After the release of The Downward Spiral, many bands such as Gravity Kills, Stabbing Westward, Filter, and Mötley Crüe made albums that imitated the sound of Nine Inch Nails.

Reznor interpreted The Downward Spiral as an extension of himself that "became the truth fulfilling itself," as he experienced personal and social issues presented in the album after its release. He had already struggled with social anxiety disorder and depression and started his abuse of narcotics including cocaine while he went on an alcohol binge. Around this time, his studio perfectionism, struggles with addiction, and bouts of writer's block prolonged the production of The Fragile, and Reznor completed rehabilitation from drugs in 2001.

One year after The Downward Spiral’s release, the band released an accompanying remix album titled Further Down the Spiral. It features contributions from Coil with Danny Hyde, J. G. Thirlwell, electronic musician Aphex Twin, producer Rick Rubin, and Jane's Addiction guitarist Dave Navarro. The album peaked at number 23 on the Billboard 200 and received mixed reviews. Recoiled, a remix EP of "Gave Up", "Closer", "The Downward Spiral", and "Eraser" by Coil, was released on February 24, 2014, via British record label Cold Spring.

Retrospective reviews regard The Downward Spiral as one of the most important albums of the 1990s and Reznor's greatest work. The 2004 edition of The New Rolling Stone Album Guide gave the album five out of five stars and called it "a powerful statement, and one of the landmark albums of the Nineties." Writing for Entertainment Weekly, Kyle Anderson remembered watching the music video of "Closer" on MTV as an adolescent and expressed that the album changed his perception of popular music from that of songs heard on the radio to albums with cover art. Stereogums Tom Breihan remains favorable toward the album since influenced youth culture, with teenagers wearing ripped fish nets on their arms. The album was also included in the book 1001 Albums You Must Hear Before You Die. According to Acclaimed Music, it is the 162nd most acclaimed album, based on appearances in critics' all-time lists.

Controversies

"Big Man with a Gun" lyrics
The Downward Spirals emphasis on transgressive themes drew criticism from American social conservatives. Senator Bob Dole, then the head of the Republican Party, sharply denounced Time Warner, the former owner of Interscope's former parent company Warner Music Group, after a meeting between Michael J. Fuchs (head of WMG), William Bennett, and C. Delores Tucker. During the meeting, Tucker and Bennett demanded that Fuchs recite lyrics from "Big Man with a Gun". Interscope had previously been blamed for releasing gangsta rap albums by rappers such as Dr. Dre, Tupac Shakur and Snoop Dogg that were deemed objectionable. Reznor called Tucker (who erroneously referred to Nine Inch Nails as a gangsta rap act) "such a fucking idiot", and claimed that the song was actually a satire of the gangsta rap genre as a whole and was originally about madness. Reznor conceded The Downward Spiral could be "harmful, through implying and subliminally suggesting things", whereas hardcore hip hop could be "cartoonish". Robert Bork also repeatedly referenced "Big Man with a Gun" in his book Slouching Toward Gomorrah as evidence of a cultural decline. The book also incorrectly states that it is a rap song.

Alleged contribution to the Columbine shooting

Before the Columbine High School massacre, perpetrator Dylan Klebold referenced lyrics from Nine Inch Nails songs multiple times in his journal. Klebold heavily identified with the protagonist of The Downward Spiral as a symbol of his own depression. On May 4, 1999, a hearing on the marketing and distribution practices of violent content to minors by the television, music, film, and video game industries was conducted before the United States Senate Committee on Commerce, Science and Transportation. The committee heard testimony from cultural observers, professors, and mental health professionals, that included conservative William Bennett and the Archbishop of Denver, Reverend Charles J. Chaput. Participants criticized the album, Nine Inch Nails' label-mate Marilyn Manson, and the 1999 film The Matrix for their alleged contribution to the environment that made incidents like Columbine possible. The committee requested that the Federal Trade Commission and the United States Department of Justice investigate the entertainment industry's marketing practices to minors.

iPhone application refusal
In 2009, Apple rejected a proposal for a Nine Inch Nails iPhone software application, citing objectionable content in the title track. Days later, Apple reversed the decision, but refused to explain its reasoning.

Track listing

Original release

Notes
 The opening sounds of "Mr. Self Destruct" are a sample from the film THX 1138 in which a man is being beaten by a prison guard.
 The sample of screams that plays throughout "The Becoming" is from the film Robot Jox, when a giant robot falls on a crowd of spectators.
 The sample at the beginning of "Big Man with a Gun" comes from a studio-altered recording of a porn star having an orgasm. According to the album booklet, this "sample" is titled "Steakhouse" and is credited to Tommy Lee.
 Japanese pressings of the album contain a cover of Joy Division's song "Dead Souls", originally included on the soundtrack to the film The Crow. The track is placed in between "Big Man with a Gun" and "A Warm Place".
 The break in "Reptile" contains an audio sample (starting at 5:06) of a woman falling down a hill from the 1974 film The Texas Chain Saw Massacre.
 The first Australian pressing has track length errors. Affected tracks do not play at their beginnings when selected individually ("Big Man with a Gun" has the beginning of "A Warm Place" tacked on, likewise all the songs up to "Hurt" start 41 seconds earlier than they should. "Hurt" itself has 44 seconds of silence on the end as a result); however, the disc plays and flows correctly as a whole.

Deluxe edition (Halo 8 DE)
To mark the album's tenth anniversary, The Downward Spiral was re-released on November 23, 2004, in high-resolution SACD and DualDisc formats. Disc one of the album's deluxe edition re-release is nearly identical to the original version; track anomalies such as sounds from previous tracks creeping up on start of tracks are fixed, and it includes a stereo and multi-channel SACD layer. The second bonus disc is a collection of remixes and B-sides and also includes a stereo SACD layer in addition to the Redbook CD layer. The last three tracks on the bonus disc are previously unreleased demo recordings from the original album.

DualDisc (Halo 8 DVD-A)

The DualDisc edition of The Downward Spiral contains the same CD content on Side A as the Deluxe Edition, with a DVD-Audio layer on Side B. When played on DVD-Video players a Dolby Digital 5.1 multi-channel or Dolby Digital 2.0 stereo mix of The Downward Spiral can be selected, along with videos of "March of the Pigs", "Hurt" and an uncensored video of "Closer". There is also an interactive discography and an image gallery. High resolution 24-bit/48 kHz 5.1 Surround sound and stereo versions of The Downward Spiral can be played on a DVD-Audio player, allowing the user a similar high fidelity experience as the SACD layer of the Deluxe Edition. The DualDisc release does not contain the additional B-sides and demo tracks.

Personnel
Credits adapted from the liner notes of The Downward Spiral.

 Trent Reznor – vocals, all instruments, drums (on "Piggy"), arranger, producer
 Mark "Flood" Ellis – producer, hi-hat (on "Closer"), ARP 2600 synthesizer (on "The Becoming")
 Chris Vrenna – drums (on "Hurt"), programming, sampling, additional drums (on "Burn")
 Adrian Belew – texture generating guitar (on "Mr. Self Destruct"), ring mod guitar (on "The Becoming")
 Danny Lohner – additional guitar (on "Big Man with a Gun")
 Andy Kubiszewski – drums (on "The Downward Spiral")
 Stephen Perkins – drum loops (on "I Do Not Want This")
 Charlie Clouser – programming, continuity
 John Aguto – engineer
 Brian Pollack – engineer
 Sean Beavan – mixing
 Bill Kennedy – mixing
 Alan Moulder – mixing
 Tom Baker – mastering
 Bob Ludwig – high-resolution mastering (reissue)
 James Brown – 5.1 mix (reissue)
 Neal Ferrazzani – assistance (reissue)
 Russell Mills – paintings
 David Buckland – photography
 Gary Talpas – package
 Rob Sheridan – package, additional photography (reissue)

Charts

Weekly charts

Year-end charts

Certifications

References

Bibliography

External links
 Album review — By AbsolutePunk
 Album review — By Alternative Press

1994 albums
Albums produced by Flood (producer)
Albums produced by Trent Reznor
Albums recorded at A&M Studios
Albums recorded at Record Plant (Los Angeles)
Concept albums
Interscope Records albums
Nine Inch Nails albums
Nothing Records albums
Obscenity controversies in music
Albums with cover art by Russell Mills (artist)
Albums recorded in a home studio
Albums recorded at Henson Recording Studios